Gordon Den (born 11 July 1939) is a Rhodesian cricketer. He played 27 first-class matches between 1963/64 and 1969/70 and 2 List A matches in the 1969/70 season.

He is the uncle of current Zimbabwe international Craig Ervine, former Zimbabwe international Sean Ervine, and Ryan Ervine, who played domestic limited overs cricket in Zimbabwe in 2009/10 season. Den's father, Alexander is recorded as having made one appearance for Rhodesia against the touring Australian national side in 1936.

References

External links
 

1939 births
Living people
Rhodesia cricketers
Eastern Province cricketers
Sportspeople from Harare